César Cascabel is a novel written by Jules Verne in 1890. It is part of Voyages Extraordinaires series (The Extraordinary Voyages). It was published in English in two-volume form, with subtitles "The Show on Ice" and "The Travelling Circus".

Plot summary
The story starts in Sacramento in 1867. The Cascabels are a French family of circus artists who plan to return home after several years spent touring the United States. However, their savings are stolen, so the family cannot afford the ship fare. Instead, César Cascabel decides to travel overland, via Alaska and Bering Straits, through Siberia and Central Russia with their horse-drawn carriage, the Belle-Roulotte (the Fair Rambler). They expect to encounter no dangers along their intended route.

On their way crossing the Alaskan border, with the help of native girl Kayette, they rescue a Russian political fugitive, count Narkine, whom they bring along so that he can see again his father in Russia. Count Narkine adopts Kayette as his daughter. While in Sitka, the group witnesses the transfer of Alaska to the United States.

On their way from Port Clarence the travellers unfortunately end up on a floating iceberg that drifts in Arctic Ocean to the Lyakhovsky Islands. There they are captured by the natives. Other troubles, including political ones, occur but Cascabels manage to get through the Urals to Perm and then, easily, to France.

An animated TV series inspired by the book was produced in 2001 in France.

External links

Text of the novel in French
 (the TV series)

1890 French novels
Novels by Jules Verne
Novels set in Alaska
Novels set in Russia
Novels set in the Arctic
Novels set in California
Mexico in fiction
Circus books
Novels set in British Columbia
Fiction set in 1867
New Siberian Islands